Thomas Betts (June 3, 1650 – between September 5 and December 24, 1717) was a deputy of the General Assembly of the Colony of Connecticut from Norwalk in the sessions of May 1692, and October 1694, and a member of the Connecticut House of Representatives in the sessions of May and October 1704, October 1705, and May 1707.

Biography

He was born June 3, 1650, in Guilford, Connecticut Colony, the son of Thomas Betts (1615–1688) and Mary Raymond. He was the brother of Samuel Betts. He moved to Norwalk with his parents in 1664.

On December 15, 1709, the town granted, by majority vote, to Joseph Birchard, Thomas Betts, John Betts, and John Gregory, Jr., permission to build a dam for the purpose of a powering a grist mill.

References 

1650 births
1717 deaths
Deputies of the Connecticut General Assembly (1662–1698)
Members of the Connecticut House of Representatives
Millers
Politicians from Norwalk, Connecticut
People from Guilford, Connecticut
People of colonial Connecticut